The Lighthouse Route is a scenic roadway in the Canadian province of Nova Scotia.

List of Highways

Numbered
Trunk 3
Highway 103
Route 309
Route 329  
Route 330  
Route 331
Route 332
Route 333

Named Roads
Brighton Road
East Green Harbour Road
Little Harbour Road
Port Clyde Road
Sandy Point Road
Shore Road
West Sable Road

List of Communities (east to west)

Halifax
Halifax Peninsula
Armdale
 Mainland Halifax
Beechville
Goodwood
Hatchet Lake
Whites lake
Shad Bay
Bayside
Peggys Cove
Indian Harbour
Hackett's Cove
Glen Margaret
Seabright
French Village
Glen Haven
Tantallon
Upper Tantallon
Hubbards
Aldersville
Aspotogan
Bayswater
Beech Hill
Blandford
Chester
Chester Basin
Chester Grant
Deep Cove
East River
Forties Settlement
Fox Point
Mill Cove
Mill Road
New Ross
New Russell
Northeast Cove
Petite Riviere
Crescent Beach
Dublin Shore
LaHave
West LaHave
Pleasantville
Bridgewater
Oak Hill
Mahone Bay 
Upper LaHave
Middle LaHave
East LaHave
Rose Bay
Riverport
Lunenburg
Liverpool
Lockeport
Sable River
Louis Head
Little Harbour
Lockeport
East Green Harbour
East Jordan
Shelburne
Barrington Passage
Centreville
Baccaro
Clyde River
Charlesville
Lower Woods Harbour
Argyle
Tusket
Yarmouth

References

Scenic travelways in Nova Scotia
Roads in Halifax, Nova Scotia
Roads in the Region of Queens Municipality
Roads in Shelburne County, Nova Scotia
Roads in Lunenburg County, Nova Scotia
Roads in Yarmouth County